Gymnophthalmus vanzoi is a species of lizard in the family Gymnophthalmidae. The species is endemic to South America.

Etymology
The specific name, vanzoi, is in honor of Brazilian herpetologist Paulo Vanzolini.

Geographic range
G. vanzoi is found in northern Brazil (in the Brazilian states of Pará and Roraima) and in Guyana.

Habitat
The preferred natural habitat of G. vanzoi is forest.

Reproduction
G. vanzoi is oviparous.

References

Further reading
Carvalho CM (1999). "Uma nova espécie de microteiideo do gênero Gymnophthalmus do estado de Roraima, Brasil (Sauria: Gymnophthalmidae)". Papéis Avulsos de Zoologia, São Paulo 40 (10): 161–174. (Gymnophthalmus vanzoi, new species). (in Portuguese).
Silva-da-Silva M, Almeida-Santos DA, Ribeiro S, Recoder RS, Santos AP (2020). "Reproductive Biology and Sexual Dimorphism of Gymnophthalmus vanzoi (Squamata, Gymnophthalmidae) in a Population South of the Amazon River, Brazil". South American Journal of Herpetology 15: 30–40.

Gymnophthalmus
Reptiles of Brazil
Reptiles of Guyana
Reptiles described in 1999
Taxa named by Celso Morato de Carvalho